James David "Jim" Grogan (December 7, 1931 – July 3, 2000) was an American figure skater who won a bronze medal at the 1952 Oslo Olympics. He also won four silver medals at the United States Figure Skating Championships and at the World Figure Skating Championships.  During his competitive career, he was coached by Edi Scholdan at the Broadmoor World Arena in Colorado Springs, Colorado.

After turning professional, he performed in Arthur Wirtz's Hollywood Ice Revue, with Sonja Henie's European tour, and later in Ice Capades before taking up coaching.  He founded a skating school at Squaw Valley and coached at the Ice Castle International Training Center in Lake Arrowhead, California for many years.  He was inducted into the United States Figure Skating Hall of Fame in 1991.

Grogan was born in Tacoma, Washington. He was married to 1960 Olympic pair champion Barbara Wagner, but they later divorced.  He died suddenly of multiple organ failure on July 3, 2000, in San Bernardino, California. He was survived by his daughter and son and second wife Yasuko Grogan.

Competitive highlights

References

1931 births
2000 deaths
American male single skaters
Figure skaters at the 1948 Winter Olympics
Figure skaters at the 1952 Winter Olympics
Olympic bronze medalists for the United States in figure skating
Olympic medalists in figure skating
World Figure Skating Championships medalists
Medalists at the 1952 Winter Olympics
Sportspeople from Tacoma, Washington
Deaths from multiple organ failure